Nawra  is a village in the administrative district of Gmina Chełmża, within Toruń County, Kuyavian-Pomeranian Voivodeship, in north-central Poland.

The village has a population of 480.

The landmark heritage sites of Nawra are the Nawra Palace, which was the former residence of the Kruszyński and Sczaniecki families, and the Gothic-Baroque parish church of Saint Catherine of Alexandria, which dates back to the 14th century.

References

Nawra